St. James Church (also known as Garth Chapel) is a historic church located northwest of Charlottesville near Owensville, Albemarle County, Virginia, United States on VA 614 east of VA 676. The vernacular Gothic Revival chapel was constructed in 1896 with the help of the Garth Family and the sponsorship of Christ Episcopal Church in Charlottesville.  The church served a congregation of between 25–30 people at its construction.  Regular worship services were held up until the 1940s, after which only graveside funeral services were held.  Beginning in 1974 and continuing to the present day, christenings, weddings, and funerals were held in the church.  Although there is no active congregation, St. James Church continues to be a consecrated Episcopal Church.

It was added to the National Register of Historic Places on January 14, 2013.

See also

 Episcopal Diocese of Virginia
 National Register of Historic Places listings in Albemarle County, Virginia

References

External links
Garth Chapel, Garth Road (State Route 676), Owensville, Albemarle County, VA:  5 measured drawings and 9 data pages from the Historic American Buildings Survey
St. James Church, Albemarle Co.:  4 photos from Virginia Department of Historic Resources

19th-century Episcopal church buildings
Churches completed in 1896
Churches in Albemarle County, Virginia
Episcopal churches in Virginia
Gothic Revival church buildings in Virginia
Historic American Buildings Survey in Virginia
National Register of Historic Places in Albemarle County, Virginia
Churches on the National Register of Historic Places in Virginia